The Beast may refer to:

Religion 
 The Beast (Revelation), two beasts described in the New Testament Book of Revelation

Fictional character 
 The Beast in William Golding's Lord of the Flies
 The Beast in the Poltergeist film series
 The main antagonist of Kung Fu Hustle
 The main antagonist of the first season of The Magicians
 The Beast, from the fairy tale Beauty and the Beast
 The Beast (Disney), from the 1991 animated Disney film Beauty and the Beast
 The Beast, from the miniseries Over the Garden Wall
 The Beast, from the Doctor Who 2-part story episodes "The Impossible Planet" and "The Satan Pit"
 The Beast, an Ork Warboss from Games Workshop's Warhammer 40,000 universe 
 The Beast, a split personality of the character Kevin Wendell Crumb and an antagonist in M. Night Shyamalan's 2016 film Split.
 Beast (comics), originally known as The Beast

Films 
 The Beast (1916 film), a Fox Film film
 The Beast (1974 film), a French/Italian drama
 The Beast, also titled La Bête, a 1975 French film
 The Beast (1986 film), an Icelandic film
 The Beast (1988 film), an American film based on the play Nanawatai
 The Beast (1996 film), a made-for-TV movie based on the 1991 novel Beast
 The Beast (1995 film), a short film featured at the 1995 Cannes Film Festival
 The Beast (2011 film), a South Korean film
 The Beast (2019 film), a South Korean film
 The Beast (2020 film), an Italian film
 The Beast (2023 film), a French film

Television 
 The Beast (2001 TV series), a short-lived 2001 TV series
 The Beast, a 2007 television movie starring Ian Gomez
 The Beast (2009 TV series), an American crime drama starring Patrick Swayze
 "The Beast" (Neon Genesis Evangelion), the second episode of the anime television series

Music 
 The Beast, a guitar owned by Bernie Marsden
 The Beast (band), a hip hop and jazz band
 The Beast (album), a 2004 album by Vader
 "The Beast" (song), a 2007 song by Angus and Julia Stone
 "The Beast", a song by the Fugees from their album The Score
 "The Beast", a song by the band Concrete Blonde from their 1990 album Bloodletting
 "The Beast", a song by Darkthrone from their album Ravishing Grimness

Books
 The Beast: Riding the Rails and Dodging Narcos on the Migrant Trail, a 2013 translation of a 2010 nonfiction work by El Salvadorian journalist Óscar Martínez 
The Beast (Roslund & Hellström novel), 2005 novel published in Swedish as Odjuret
The Beast (Mola novel), a 2021 novel by the pseudonymous Spanish writer Carmen Mola

People 
 The Beast (nickname), a list of people
 The Beast (wrestler), ring name of Yvon Cormier (1938–2009), Canadian professional wrestler
 Brock Lesnar (born 1977), American professional wrestler and former mixed martial arts fighter
 Bob Sapp (born 1973), American mixed martial arts fighter
 Dan Severn (born 1958), American mixed martial arts fighter
 Daigo Umehara (born 1981), Japanese professional gamer
 Mark Labbett (born 1965), British TV personality known for his role as a Chaser on The Chase
 Adebayo Akinfenwa, British footballer
 Eddie Hall (born 1988), British strongman
 "The Beast from the East", the nickname of American professional wrestler Bam Bam Bigelow (1961–2007)

Technology 
 The Beast (car), a Rolls-Royce Meteor tank engine-powered automobile
 Presidential state car (United States), the state car of the President of the United States, nicknamed "The Beast"
 The Beast (roller coaster), a wooden roller coaster at Kings Island near Cincinnati, Ohio

Other uses 
La Bestia ("The Beast"), a Mexican freight train ridden north by migrants
 The Beast (game), an alternate reality game promoting A.I.: Artificial Intelligence
 The Beast (newspaper), a Buffalo, New York newspaper
 The Daily Beast, an American news and opinion website
 2014 HQ124, a near-Earth asteroid nicknamed "The Beast"
 "The Beast", the 2016 Fort McMurray wildfire in Alberta, Canada

See also 
 Beast (disambiguation)
 Mr. Beast (disambiguation)
 Beastie (disambiguation)
 Beastmaster (disambiguation)